Carl Christian Martens (1754-1820), variously referred to as Christian Martens and C. C. Martens, was a Danish master bricklayer and architect. He was elderman of the Bricklayers' Guild in Copenhagen and contributed to the rebuilding of the city in the years after the Copenhagen Fire of 1795. Most of his surviving buildings have been listed on the Danish Registry of Protected Buildings and Places.

Early life and education
Martens was born in 1754 to Joachim Christian Martens and Johanne Kirstine Arhellig(e). He was trained as a bricklayer and attended the Royal Danish Academy of Fine Arts' Building School in 1768 and 1775, He won the Academy's small silver medal in 1771 and its large silver medal in 1775. He registered for the competition for the gold medal in 1775.

Career
Martens was granted citizenship as a master bricklayer in Copenhagen in 1777. He was alderman of the Bricklayers' Guild in 1793–99. He was also active in Copenhagen Fire Department (as was typical for the city's master craftsmen at the time). He contributed to the rebuilding of Copenhagen in the years after the Great Fire of 1795.

Personal life
Martens married Ernestine Wegener on 10 November 1784 in Copenhagen. He died in 1820 and is buried in Asminderød Cemetery at Fredensborg.

Works
 
 
Martens constructed and designed the following buildings:

 Knabrostræde 12 Copenhagen (1795–96)
 Brolæggerstræde 8/Knabrostræde (1796–97; listed in 1950)
 Bremerholm 33/Laksegade 17m Copenhagen (1796–97, demolished)
 Laksegade 31, Copenhagen (demolished)
 Holmens Kanal 6, Copenhagen (1798, demolished)
 Holmens Kanal 8, Copenhagen (1798, demolished)
 Studiestræde 21, Copenhagen (1797, heightened in 1890; listed in 1951)
 Studiestræde 8, Copenhagen (1798; listed in 1996)
 Larsbjørnsstræde 16/Studiestræde 23, Copenhagen (1798; listed in 1964)
 Læderstræde 16, Copenhagen (1799-1800)
 Amagertorv 15, Copenhagen (1799-1800)
 Kattesundet 18/Lavendelstræde 2 (1802, listed in 1964)
 Kronprinsensgade 5, Copenhagen (1803–05; listed in 1918)
 Nørre Voldgade 20/Teglgårdstræde 15 (1808–09)

References

External links
 Carl Christian Martens at Kunstindeks Danmark

1754 births
1820 deaths
18th-century Danish architects
19th-century Danish architects
Danish bricklayers
Architects from Copenhagen